Salvia piasezkii is an herb that is native to Gansu and Shaanxi provinces in China. Inflorescences are 6-flowered widely spaced verticillasters in few branched panicles.

Notes

piasezkii
Flora of China